The term "party of power" refers to a political party that has a close relationship with the executive branch of government such that the party appears to function as an extension of the executive rather than as an autonomous political organization. The concept resembles that of a cartel party. In a presidential republic, the party of power typically forms a legislative block that backs the executive. The concept has been commonly applied to post-Soviet political parties. Claims have been made that United Russia, the New Azerbaijan Party, Kazakhstan's Amanat, the People's Democratic Party of Tajikistan, the Democratic Party of Turkmenistan and Georgian Dream (from 2013) are parties of power. Parties that have been considered as parties of power in the past include the Union of Citizens of Georgia (until 2003), the Georgia's United National Movement (until 2013) and the Republican Party of Armenia (until 2018).

Parties of power are typically described as having a hierarchical top-down structure, being centralised, organised in clientelistic networks, lacking a defined or coherent ideology and playing a subordinate role towards the bureaucracy. They have been created by the state as a method to assist in the political interests of the executive branch but while also being reliant on the state to manipulate election outcomes.

The use of the concept and of the term "party of power" has been criticized, including by those who claim that, strictly speaking, United Russia and Amanat do not possess or exercise power themselves. It is not the parties that make decisions and policies in the last resort. The term "parties of power" may therefore be regarded as misleading.

Russian parties of power

In the Russian language, the term "party of power" is used to describe the party which advocates the current head of state, the party which belongs to/is controlled by the current government or the party established by the current highest official in the state. The terms "ruling party" and "party of power" can be considered as antonyms, because a party of power will be established after a presidential election to support the winner and not the reverse. The party has the same ideology as the president or prime minister. A party which supports the current president without difficulty wins parliamentary elections. After the party leader loses a presidential election, a party of power without coherent ideology, as a rule, ceases to exist.

List of Russian parties of power
These parties were specially established for support of the incumbent president or prime minister in the Russian parliament:
 Inter-regional Deputies Group/Democratic Russia (1990–1993, Congress of People's Deputies of the Soviet Union/Congress of People's Deputies of Russia/Supreme Soviet of Russia)
 Democratic Choice of Russia (1993–1994)
 Our Home – Russia (1995–1999, so called "centre-right party of power")
 Unity (1999–2001/2003)
 A Just Russia (the second "party of power", supporting Vladimir Putin and opposing United Russia)
United Russia (2001–present)

See also
 Ruling party
 Dominant-party system
 Multi-party system
 Non-partisan democracy

References

Literature 
 
 
 
 
 

Ruling party
Politics of Russia
Politics of Kazakhstan
Politics of Azerbaijan
Types of political parties